Inauguration of Theodore Roosevelt may refer to: 

First inauguration of Theodore Roosevelt, 1901
Second inauguration of Theodore Roosevelt, 1905